Albert Martin Pohlman (born July 1868) was a one-term Republican mayor of South Norwalk, Connecticut from 1910 to 1911.

He was the son of Fred and Louisa Pohlman, German immigrants.

In 1925, Pohlman ran against incumbent Republican mayor of Norwalk Thomas Robins, but was defeated.

From 1933 to 1935, Pohlman was president of the Norwalk Common Council. During the term of fellow Democratic mayor Charles C. Swartz, he had a break with the local Democrats. In 1935, he sought the party nomination for mayor, but the nomination went to Frank T. Stack. He formed the People's Party, with former South Norwalk mayor Robert M. Wolfe as his campaign manager. He lost to Stack in a four-way race.

References 

1868 births
American people of German descent
Physicians from Connecticut
Mayors of Norwalk, Connecticut
Connecticut city council members
Connecticut Democrats
Connecticut Republicans
Year of death missing